The Cabinet of Sigmundur Davíð Gunnlaugsson in Iceland was formed 23 May 2013. The cabinet left office 7 April 2016 due to the Panama Papers leak.

Cabinet

Inaugural cabinet: 23 May 2013 – 26 August 2014

First reshuffle: 26 August 2014 – 4 December 2014
Due to a political scandal within the Ministry of the Interior, affairs relating to the judiciary, prosecution, law enforcement and civil defence were transferred to Prime Minister Sigmundur Davíð Gunnlaugsson hence making him the Minister of Justice.

Second reshuffle: 4 December 2014 – 31 December 2014
Ólöf Nordal replaced Hanna Birna Kristjánsdóttir as Minister of the Interior. Affairs relating to the judiciary, prosecution, law enforcement and civil defence were transferred back to the Minister of the Interior.

Third reshuffle: 31 December 2014 – 7 April 2016
Sigrún Magnúsdóttir replaced Sigurður Ingi Jóhannsson as Minister for the Environment and Natural Resources.

See also
Government of Iceland
Cabinet of Iceland

References

Sigmundur David Gunnlaugsson, Cabinet of
Sigmundur David Gunnlaugsson, Cabinet of
Sigmundur David Gunnlaugsson, Cabinet of
Cabinets established in 2013
Cabinets disestablished in 2016
Independence Party (Iceland)
Progressive Party (Iceland)